Bebearia plistonax, the plistonax forester, is a butterfly in the family Nymphalidae. It is found in Nigeria, Cameroon, Gabon, the Republic of the Congo, the Central African Republic, Angola, the Democratic Republic of the Congo (Ubangi, Mongala, Uele, northern Kivu, Tshopo, Tshuapa, Equateur, Kasai, Sankuru and Lualaba), Uganda, north-western Tanzania and northern Zambia. The habitat consists of forests.

Adults are attracted to fallen fruit.

The larvae feed on Ochna pulchra.

References

Butterflies described in 1874
plistonax
Butterflies of Africa
Taxa named by William Chapman Hewitson